Beauport, also known as Sleeper–McCann House, Little Beauport, or Henry Davis Sleeper House, is a historic house in Gloucester, Massachusetts.

Background
Beauport was built starting in 1908 as the summer home of interior decorator and antique collector Henry Davis Sleeper. Situated on the rocks overlooking Gloucester Harbor, the structure was repeatedly enlarged and modified by Sleeper, and filled with a large collection of fine art, folk art, architectural artifacts, and other collectible materials. Sleeper decorated its rooms, which came to number 56, to evoke different historical and literary themes. After his death, Charles and Helena Woolworth McCann acquired the house and its contents. They preserved much of the Sleeper's designs and decorations, but made some modifications, including adding their porcelain collection to the house. Their heirs donated the property to the Society for the Protection of New England Antiquities (now Historic New England) in 1947, who operate the property as a house museum.

Beauport served as Sleeper's escape, a backdrop for summer parties, and as a showcase for his professional skills. The house has frequently been written about in books and magazines, with the first major article appearing in House Beautiful in 1916. It has been featured in such diverse publications as Architectural Digest, Country Living, and The Boston Globe, and has been showcased on television programs such as America's Castles.

Preservation
Beauport was declared a National Historic Landmark in 2003, in recognition for its distinctive architecture, its unique collection of artifacts, and for its association for Sleeper, whose design influence extended across the wealthy elite of the eastern United States. In addition to the main house, the property also has a gate house, garage, and toolshed that were built by Sleeper. The gate house has been adapted by Historic New England as a visitor reception area, and the toolshed now houses restrooms. The garage is used for storage and as office space. There is a single non-contributing building on the property, a caretaker's house, which is potentially of local historic interest as an example of a prefabricated post-World War II residential structure.

Gallery

External links

 Official web site at Historic New England

See also

National Register of Historic Places listings in Gloucester, Massachusetts
National Register of Historic Places listings in Essex County, Massachusetts
List of National Historic Landmarks in Massachusetts

References
Notes

Bibliography
 Shoemaker, L. "Backstage at Beauport: SPNEA shines a spotlight on the extended family who made the house work." Historic New England, Summer 2004.

Houses completed in 1907
Historic house museums in Massachusetts
National Historic Landmarks in Massachusetts
Museums in Essex County, Massachusetts
Biographical museums in Massachusetts
Shingle Style houses
Houses in Gloucester, Massachusetts
Decorative arts museums in the United States
Houses on the National Register of Historic Places in Essex County, Massachusetts
Historic New England
Shingle Style architecture in Massachusetts